South Serbia ( / Južna Srbija) was a province (pokrajina) of the Kingdom of Serbs, Croats and Slovenes that existed between 1919 and 1922. It encompassed the modern territories of Sandžak (parts of Serbia and Montenegro), Kosovo and North Macedonia. The term "Old Serbia", was historically used in Serbian politics, literature and science for the territories of the province. The term continued in use for the Vardar Banovina and Zeta Banovina following its disestablishment.

History
The province was established in 1919, following the creation of Yugoslavia on 1 December 1918. Serbia had greatly expanded its borders during the Balkan Wars. The province was disestablished in 1922 and its territories were reorganized into the Vardar Banovina and Zeta Banovina. The term was then colloquially used for those territories.

Economy
The province of South Serbia, as a mostly highland region, had favorable conditions for development of cattle breeding as illustrated by statistics on the increase of livestock numbers. The livestock numbers exceeded 13% of the total number of all of Yugoslavia. The restoration of cattle breeding, which had been destroyed during the war years, was the primary goal of the Ministry of Economy.

Demographics
In 1921, the province had  1.7 million inhabitants. Following the First World War in Vardar Macedonia and the so called Western Outlands, the local Bulgarian/Macedonian population was not recognized as separate community and became a subject of state-policy of  Serbianisation.

References

Sources

External links

Pokrajinas of the Kingdom of Serbs, Croats and Slovenes
Former subdivisions of Serbia
Yugoslav Serbia
Yugoslav Macedonia
1919 establishments in Yugoslavia
1922 disestablishments in Yugoslavia
States and territories established in 1919
States and territories disestablished in 1922
Kingdom of Serbia
Vardar Macedonia (1918–1941)
History of Sandžak